Bremen-St Magnus is a railway station serving the St. Magnus district of Bremen. The station is located on the Bremen-Vegesack–Bremen railway line.

References

Railway stations in Bremen (state)
Transport in Bremen (city)
Bremen S-Bahn